Brij Bhushan Mani Tripathi was a Member of Legislative Assembly and Indian politician affiliated with the Bharatiya Janata Party. He joined BJP and fought in the 1996 Election.

Political career

He was elected consecutively 4 times block pramukh. Tripathi was elected in 1989 Assembly Election where he defeated Mitrasen Yadav who was a former three-time MLA on an Indian National Congress Party ticket.
After defeating him he gained popularity and emerged as a great politician over time.

He was also provided with a sanctioned gunner from the government for safety purposes as he was convicted over with 12 criminal cases over him in  1996.

Tripathi also ran institutions in his constituency and did a lot of work for the upliftment of the people of the society.
Later, BJP nominated him as a Member Of Legislative Council during the tenure of Rajnath Singh.

He died on 21 February 2001. At the time of his death, he represented Bharatiya Janta Party from Milkipur.

A statue was made in his constituency which was inaugurated by the Union Minister of State for Home Affairs of India, Shri Swami Chinmayanand at that time.

References 

Uttar Pradesh MLAs 1989–1991
People from Faizabad
Bharatiya Janata Party politicians from Uttar Pradesh
1941 births
2001 deaths
People from Uttar Pradesh